Gelişim Koleji Spor Kulübü, more commonly known as Gelişim Koleji, is a Turkish professional basketball club based in İzmir which plays Turkish Basketball League (TBL). The team was founded by Gelişim College in 2000. Their home arena is Gelişim Koleji Sports Hall with a capacity of 500 seats.

External links 
 Gelişim Koleji Spor Kulübü, official website
 Official Facebook page
 Twitter page

Basketball teams in Turkey
Baseball teams established in 2000
Sports teams in İzmir